Radovna may refer to:
 Radovna (river), a river in Slovenia
 Radovna Valley, a valley in Slovenia
 Radovna, a village in the Municipality of Gorje, Slovenia
 Zgornja Radovna, a village in the Municipality of Kranjska Gora, Slovenia